The Cimmerians were an ancient Eastern Iranian equestrian nomadic people originating in the Caspian steppe, part of whom subsequently migrated into West Asia. Although the Cimmerians were culturally Scythian, they formed an ethnic unit separate from the Scythians proper, to whom the Cimmerians were related and who displaced and replaced the Cimmerians.

The Cimmerians themselves left no written records, and most information about them is largely derived from Assyrian records of the 8th to 7th centuries BC and from Graeco-Roman authors from the 5th century BC and later.

Name 
The English name  is derived from Latin , itself derived from the Ancient Greek ,) of an ultimately uncertain origin for which there have been various proposals:
according to János Harmatta, it was derived from Old Iranian , meaning "union of clans."

 and in the form  in Hebrew.

Identification
The Cimmerians were a nomadic Iranian people of the Eurasian Steppe. Archaeologically, there was no difference between the material cultures of the pre-Scythian populations living in the areas corresponding to the Caucasian steppe and the Volga and Don river regions around it, and there were also no other significant differences between the Cimmerians and the Scythians, who were related populations indistinguishable from each other in terms of culture and origins.

Other suggestions for the ethnicity for the Cimmerians include the possibility of their being Thracian, or Thracians with an Iranian ruling class, or a separate group closely related to Thracian peoples, as well as a Maeotian origin. However, the proposal of a Thracian origin of the Cimmerians has been criticised as arising from a confusion by Strabo between the Cimmerians and their allies, the Thracian tribe of the Treri.

Location
The original homeland of the Cimmerians before they migrated into West Asia was in the steppe situated to the north of the Caspian Sea and to the west of the Araxēs river until the Cimmerian Bosporus, and some Cimmerians might have nomadised in the Kuban steppe; the Cimmerians thus originally lived in the Caspian and Caucasian steppes, in the area corresponding to present-day Southern Russia. The region of the Pontic Steppe until the Lake Maiōtis was instead inhabited by the Agathyrsi, who were another nomadic Iranian tribe related to the Cimmerians. The later claim by Greek authors that the Cimmerians lived in the Pontic Steppe around the Tyras river was a retroactive invention dating from after the disappearance of the Cimmerians.

The Cimmerians later split into two groups, with a western horde located in Anatolia, and an eastern horde which moved into Mannaea and later Media.

History

Origins 
The Cimmerians were originally part of a larger group of Central Asian nomadic populations who migrated to the west and formed new tribal groupings in the Pontic and Caspian steppes, with their success at expanding into Eastern Europe happening thanks to the development of mounted nomadic pastoralism and the adoption of effective weapons suited to equestrian warfare by these nomads. The steppe cultures to which the Cimmerians belonged in turn influenced the cultures of Central Europe such as the Hallstatt culture, and the Cimmerians themselves lived in the steppe situated to the north of the Caspian Sea and to the west of the Araxēs river, while the region of the Pontic Steppe until the Lake Maiōtis was instead inhabited by the Agathyrsi, who were another nomadic Iranian tribe related to the Cimmerians.

The Cimmerians are first mentioned in the 8th century BC in Homer's  as a people living beyond the Oceanus, in a land permanently deprived of sunlight at the edge of the world and close to the entrance of Hades; this mention is poetic and contains no reliable information about the real Cimmerians. Homer's story might however have used as its source the story of the Argonauts, which itself focused on the kingdom of Colchis, on whose eastern borders the Cimmerians were living in the 8th century BC. This corresponds to the 6th century BC records of Aristeas of Proconnesus and the later writings of Herodotus of Halicarnassus, according to whom the Cimmerians lived in the steppe to the immediate north of the Caspian Sea, with the Araxēs river forming their eastern border which separated them from the Scythians, although some tribes of the Scythians, a nomadic Iranian tribe living in Central Asia related to the Cimmerians, nomadised in the Caspian Steppe along the Cimmerians. The Cimmerians thus never formed the mass of the population of the Pontic Steppe, and neither Aristeas nor Hesiod ever recorded them as living in this area.

The social structure of the Cimmerians, according to Herodotus of Halicarnassus, comprised two groups of roughly equal numbers: the Cimmerians proper, or "commoners", and the "kings" or "royal race" – implying that the ruling classes and lower classes originally constituted two different peoples, who retained distinct identities as late as the end of the 2nd millennium BC. Hence the "kings" may have originated as an element of an Iranian-speaking people (such as the Scythians), who had imposed their rule on a section of the people of the Catacomb culture, who were the Cimmerian "commoners."

In the 8th to 7th centuries BC, the Cimmerians were disturbed by a significant movement of the nomads of the Eurasian Steppe: this movement started when the bulk of the Scythians migrated westwards across the Araxēs river, under the pressure of another related Central Asian nomadic Iranian tribe, either the Massagetae or the Issedones, following which the Scythians moved into the Caspian and Caucasian Steppes, assimilated most of the Cimmerians and conquered their territory, while the rest of the Cimmerians were displaced and forced to migrate to the south into West Asia. This displacement of the Cimmerians by the Scythians is attested archaeologically in a disturbance of the Chernogorovka-Novocherkassk culture associated with the Cimmerians.

Under Scythian pressure, the Cimmerians migrated to the south into West Asia. The story recounted by Greek authors, according to which the Cimmerian aristocrats, unwilling to leave their lands, killed each other and were buried in a kurgan near the Tyras river, after which only the Cimmerian "commoners" migrated to West Asia, is contradicted by how powerful the Cimmerians were according to Assyrian sources contemporaneous with their presence in West Asia; this story was thus was either a Pontic Greek folk tale which originated after the disappearance of the Cimmerians or a later Scythian legend reflecting the motif of vanished ancient lost peoples which is widespread in folk traditions.

In West Asia 
Transcaucasia would remain the Cimmerians' centre of operations during the early phase of their presence in West Asia until the early 660s BC.

The Scythians later also expanded to the south, appearing in West Asia forty years after the Cimmerians, although they followed the coast of the Caspian Sea and arrived in the region of present-day Azerbaijan.

The inroads of the Cimmerians and the Scythians into West Asia over the course of the 8th to 6th centuries BC would destabilise the political balance which had prevailed in the region between the states of Assyria, Urartu, Mannaea and Elam on one side and the mountain and tribal peoples on the other.

In Transcaucasia 

The Cimmerians might have defeated attacks by the Urartian kings against Colchis and the nearby areas during the 720s BC.

The first mention of the Cimmerians in the records of the Neo-Assyrian Empire was from between 720 and 714 BC, when Assyrian intelligence by the crown prince Sennacherib reported to the king Sargon II that the Cimmerians had attacked Urartu's province of  through the territory of the kingdom of Mannaea. This defeat weakened Urartu significantly enough that Sargon II was able to successfully attack and defeat it, and Rusa I committed suicide in consequence.

During the period corresponding to Sargon II's reign, a section of the Cimmerians moved into the area of the kingdom of Mannaea. 

The Cimmerians' presence in Anatolia might have started around 709 BC, and the king Midas II of Muški (Phrygia), who had previously been a bitter opponent of the Neo-Assyrian Empire in Anatolia, consequently ended hostilities with the Assyrians after and sent a delegation to Sargon II to attempt to form an alliance against the Cimmerians.

In 705 BC, Sargon II died in battle, most likely during a campaign against the Anatolian kingdom of Tabal, or possibly during a battle in which the Cimmerians were participants in either the region of Tabal or in Nedia.

After Sargon II's death, his son and successor Sennacherib secured the northwestern Assyrian borders, and the Cimmerians ceased being mentioned in Assyrian records during Sennacherib's reign (from 705 to 681 BC); the Cimmerians would start being mentioned again by the Assyrians only under the reign of Sennacherib's own son and successor, Esarhaddon. During this time, the Cimmerians were allied with the Scythians, and the two groups, in alliance with the Medes, who were an Iranian people of West Asia to whom the Scythians and Cimmerians were distantly related, were threatening the eastern frontier of Urartu during the reign of its king Argishti II. Argishti II's successor, Rusa II, built several fortresses in the east of Urartu's territory, including that of Teishebaini, to monitor and repel attacks by the Cimmerians, the Mannaeans, the Medes, and the Scythians.

During the period coinciding with the rule of the Assyrian king Esarhaddon (reigned 681–669 BC), the bulk of the Cimmerians migrated from Transcaucasia into Anatolia, while a smaller group remained in the area near the kingdom of Mannaea where they had been settled since the time of Sargon II, respectively forming a "western" and an "eastern" division of Cimmerians.

In Iran 
Between 680/679 and 678/677 BC, the eastern group of Cimmerians allied with the Mannaeans and the Scythian king Išpakaia to attack Assyria, with the Scythians raiding far in the south till the Assyrian province of Zamua. These allied forces were defeated by Esarhaddon, who had become the king of the Neo-Assyrian empire.

By 677 BC, the Cimmerians were present on the territory of Mannai, and in 676 BC they were its allies against an Assyrian attack, after which the eastern Cimmerians remained allied to Mannai against Assyria. In the western Iranian plateau, these eastern Cimmerians might have introduced Bronze articles from the Koban culture into the Luristan bronze culture. The Mannaeans, in alliance with the eastern Cimmerians and the Scythians (the latter of whom attacked the borderlands of Assyria from across the territory of the kingdom of Ḫubuškia), were able to expand their territories at the expense of Assyria and capture the fortresses of Šarru-iqbi and Dūr-Ellil. Negotiations between the Assyrians and the Cimmerians appeared to have followed, according to which the Cimmerians promised not to interfere in the relations between Assyria and Mannai, although a Babylonian diviner in Assyrian service warned Esarhaddon not to trust either the Mannaeans or the Cimmerians and advised him to spy on both of them.

The eastern Cimmerian group later moved to the south, into Media, with the Scythians as their northern neighbours and occasional allies, and in the mid 670s BC, these eastern Cimmerians were recorded by the Assyrians as a possible threat against the collection of tribute from Media. Around the same time, in alliance with the Scythians, the eastern Cimmerians were menacing the Assyrian provinces of Parsumaš and Bīt Ḫamban, and these joint Cimmerian-Scythian forces together were threatening communication between the Assyrian Empire and its vassal of Ḫubuškia. In 676 BC, Esarhaddon responded by carrying out a military campaign against Mannai during which he killed Išpakaia.

By the late 670s BC, the Scythians had become the allies of the Assyrians after Išpakaia's successor, Bartatua, had married a daughter of Esarhaddon, while the eastern Cimmerians remained hostile to Assyria and were allied to Ellipi and the Medes. When Ellipi and the Medes successfully rebelled against Assyria under Kashtariti from 671 to 669 BC, the eastern Cimmerians were allied to them.

In Anatolia 
By the later 7th century BC, the centre of operations of the larger, western, division of the Cimmerians was located in Anatolia.

In 679 BC the Cimmerian king Teušpa was defeated and killed by Esarhaddon near Ḫubušna in Cappadocia. Despite this victory, the military operations of the Assyrians were not fully successful and they were not able to firmly occupy the areas around Ḫubušna, nor were they able to secure their borders, and the Assyrian province of Quwê was left vulnerable to invasions from Tabal, Kuzzurak and Ḫilakku; the Cimmerians had thus ended all Assyrian control in Anatolia. An Assyrian contract dating to the same as Esarhaddon's victory over Teušpa records of the existence of a "Cimmerian detachment" in Nineveh, although it is uncertain whether this refers to Cimmerian mercenaries in Assyrian service, or simply of Assyrian soldiers armed in the "Cimmerian-style", that is using Cimmerian bows and horse harnesses.

Around 675 BC, the Cimmerians, under their king Tugdammi (the Lugdamis of the Greek authors), in alliance with the Urartian king Rusa II carried out a military campaign to the west, against Muški (Phrygia), Ḫate (the Neo-Hittite state of Melid), and Ḫaliṭu (either the Alizōnes or the Khaldoi); this campaign resulted in the invasion and destruction of Phrygia, whose king Midas II committed suicide. The Cimmerians plundered the Phrygian capital of Gordion, but they neither settled there nor destroyed its fortifications, although they appear to have consequently partially subdued the Phrygians, and an Assyrian oracular text from the later 670s BC mentioned the Cimmerians and the Phrygians, who had possibly been subdued by the Cimmerians, as allies against the Assyrians' newly conquered province of Melid.

A document from 673 BC records Rusa II as having recruited a large number of Cimmerian mercenaries, and Cimmerian allies of Rusa II probably participated in a military expedition of his in 672 BC. From 671 to 669 BC, Cimmerians in service of Rusa II attacked the Assyrian province of Šubria near the Urartian border.

Between 671 and 670 BC, some Cimmerian divisions were recorded as serving in the Assyrian army, although these divisions might have instead simply referred to the "Cimmerian style" armed Assyrian soldiers.

At yet unknown dates, the Cimmerians imposed their rule on Cappadocia, invaded Bithynia, Paphlagonia and the Troad, and took the recently founded Greek colony of Sinope, whose initial settlement was destroyed and whose first founder Habrōn was killed in the invasion, and which was later re-founded by the Greek colonists Kōos and Krētinēs. Along with Sinope, the Greek colony of Cyzicus was also destroyed during these invasions and had to be later re-founded. In the beginning of that decade, the Cimmerians attacked the kingdom of Lydia, which had been filling the power vacuum in Anatolia created by the destruction of Phrygia by establishing itself as a new rising regional power. The Lydian king Gyges, attempting to find help to face the Cimmerian invasions, contacted Esarhaddon's successor who had succeeded him as king of the Neo-Assyrian Empire, Ashurbanipal, beginning in 667 BC, and his struggle against Cimmerians soon turned in his favour. Gyges soon defeated the Cimmerians in 665 BC without Assyrian help, and he sent Cimmerian soldiers captured while attacking the Lydian countryside as gifts to Ashurbanipal. According to the Assyrian records describing these events, the Cimmerians already had formed sedentary settlements in Anatolia.

Assyrian records in 657 BC of a "bad omen" for the "Westland" might have referred to either another Cimmerian attack on Lydia, or a conquest by Tugdammi of the western possessions of the Neo-Assyrian Empire, possibly Quwê or somewhere in Syria, following their defeat by Gyges. Thus, the Cimmerians had become a force feared by Ashurbanipal, and Tugdammi's successes against Assyria meant that he had become recognised in the ancient Near East as equally powerful as Ashurbanipal. This situation remained unchanged throughout the rest of the 650s BC and the early 640s BC.

As the result of these Assyrian setbacks, Gyges could not rely on Assyrian support against the Cimmerians and he ended diplomacy with the Neo-Assyrian Empire, and Ashurbanipal responded to Gyges's disengagement from Assyria by cursing him.

The Cimmerians attacked Lydia for a third time in 644 BC: this time, they defeated the Lydians and captured their capital, Sardis, and Gyges died during this attack. Gyges was succeeded by his son Ardys, who resumed diplomatic activity with Assyria; Ashurbanipal, whose Anatolian borders were still in a delicate situation due to the Cimmerians, was himself willing to form alliances with any state in Anatolia which was capable of successfully fighting the Cimmerians.

After sacking Sardis, Lygdamis led the Cimmerians into invading the Greek city-states of Ionia and Aeolis on the western coast of Anatolia, which caused the inhabitants of the Batinētis region to flee to the islands of the Aegean Sea, and later Greek writings by Callimachus and Hesychius of Alexandria preserve the record that Lygdamis had destroyed the Artemision of Ephesus. Among the other Greek cities destroyed during these invasions was Magnesia on the Meander.

After this third invasion of Lydia and the attack on the Asiatic Greek cities, around 640 BC the Cimmerians moved to Cilicia on the north-west border of the Assyrian empire, where Tugdammi allied with Mugallu, the king of Tabal, against Assyria, during which period the Assyrian records called him a "mountain king and an arrogant Gutian (that is a barbarian) who does not know how to fear the gods." However, after facing a revolt against himself, Tugdamme allied with Assyria and acknowledged Assyrian overlordship, and sent tribute to Ashurbanipal, to whom he swore an oath. Tugdammi soon broke this oath and attacked the Assyrian Empire again, but he fell ill and died in 640 BC, and was succeeded by his son Sandakšatru, who attempted to continue Tugdammi's attacks against Assyria but failed just like his father.

By the later part of the 7th century BC, the Cimmerians were nomadising in West Asia together with the Thracian Treri tribe who had migrated across the Thracian Bosporus and invaded Anatolia. In 637 BC, Sandakšatru's Cimmerians participated in another attack on Lydia, this time led by the Treres under their king Kōbos, and in alliance with the Lycians. During this invasion, in the seventh year of the reign of Gyges's son Ardys, the Lydians were defeated again and for a second time Sardis was captured, except for its citadel, and Ardys might have been killed in this attack.

The power of the Cimmerians had eventually dwindled quickly after Tugdammi's death, and soon these Cimmerian attacks on Lydia, with Assyrian approval and in alliance with the Lydians, the Scythians under their king Madyes entered Anatolia, expelled the Treres from Asia Minor, and defeated the Cimmerians so that they no longer constituted a threat again, following which the Scythians extended their domination to Central Anatolia until they were themselves expelled by the Medes from West Asia in the 600s BC. This final defeat of the Cimmerians was carried out by the joint forces of Madyes, who Strabo credits with expelling the Cimmerians from Asia Minor, and of Gyges's great-grandson, the king Alyattes of Lydia, whom Herodotus of Halicarnassus and Polyaenus claim finally defeated the Cimmerians.

Following this final defeat, the Cimmerians likely remained in the region of Cappadocia, whose name in Armenian, may have been derived from the name of the Cimmerians. A group of Cimmerians might also have subsisted for some time in the Troas, around Antandrus, until they were finally defeated by Alyattes of Lydia. The remnants of the Cimmerians were eventually assimilated by the populations of Anatolia, and they completely disappeared from history after their defeat by Madyes and Alyattes.

In Europe 
It has been hypothesised that some Cimmerians might have migrated into Eastern, South-east and Central Europe, although such identification is presently considered very uncertain.

Impact
The inroads of the Cimmerians and the Scythians into West Asia over the course of the 8th to 6th centuries BC had destabilised the political balance which had prevailed in the region between the states of Assyria, Urartu, Mannaea and Elam on one side and the mountain and tribal peoples on the other, resulting in the destruction of these former kingdoms and their replacement by new powers, including the kingdoms of the Medes and of the Lydians.

Legacy

Ancient
After the end of the Neo-Assyrian Empire, the scribes of the Neo-Babylonian Empire which replaced it used the term  indiscriminately to refer to all the nomads of the steppes, including both the Pontic Scythians and the Central Asian Saka. The Persian Achaemenids who conquered the Neo-Babylonian Empire continued this tradition of using the name of the Cimmerians to refer to all steppe nomads in the Akkadian language, as attested in the Behistun inscription. The Byzantines from a millennium and onwards later similarly referred to the Huns, Slavs, and other populations as "Scythians."

Homer's mention of the Cimmerians as living deprived from sunlight and close to the entrance of Hades influenced later Graeco-Roman authors who, writing centuries after the disappearance of the historical Cimmerians, conceptualised of this people as the one described by Homer, and therefore assigned to them various fantastical locations and histories:
 Ephorus of Cyme in the 4th century BC placed the Cimmerians near the city of Cumae in Magna Graecia, where there was located a Ploutonion and an oracle of the dead, as well as the Lake Avernus, which possessed strange properties. According to Ephorus's narrative, these Cimmerians lived underground and would go out only at night because of a tradition of theirs to never see the Sun.
Hecataeus of Abdera placed the "Cimmerian city" in Hyperborea
Posidonius of Apamea wrote that the Cimmerians who passed into West Asia were merely a small body of exiles, while the bulk of the Cimmerians lived in the thickly wooded and sun-less far north, between the shores of the Oceanus and the Hercynian Forest, and were the same people known as the Cimbri. Both the Cimmerians and the Cimbri were perceived by the Greeks as fierce barbarian tribes who had caused significant destruction for the peoples they had invaded, and since their names were similar, the Greek traditions progressively equated and then identified them with each other.
 This assertion was criticised by Plutarch as being conjectural rather than based on concrete historical evidence.
 Strabo and Diodorus of Sicily, using Posidonius as their sources, also equated the Cimmerians and the Cimbri.

Medieval
The historical Sicambri, however, were a Germanic tribe from Gelderland in modern Netherlands and are named for the Sieg river.

Modern
But the word  "Welshman" is now accepted by Celtic linguists as being derived from a Brythonic word , meaning "compatriot".

The modern Georgian word for "hero", is said to derive from their name.

It has also been speculated that the modern Armenian city of Gyumri (Arm.  ), founded as Kumayri (Arm. ), derived its name from the Cimmerians who conquered the region and founded a settlement there.

In popular culture

, a novel by Michael Chabon, includes a chapter describing the (fictional) oldest book in the world, "The Book of Lo", created by ancient Cimmerians.

Isaac Asimov attempted to trace various place names to Cimmerian origins. He suggested that  gave rise to the Turkic toponym  (which in turn gave rise to the name "Crimea").

Manau's song "La Tribu de Dana" recounts an imaginary battle between Celts and enemies identified by the narrator as Cimmerians.

Archaeology 

Archaeologically, the Cimmerians are associated with the Chernogorovka-Novocherkassk Culture of the west Eurasian steppe, which itself showed strong influences originating from the east in Central Asia and Siberia (more specifically from the Karasuk. Arzhan, and Altai cultures), as well as from the Kuban culture of the Caucasus which contributed to its development, although an alternative view is that the Cimmerians instead belonged, materially, to the Early Scythian culture.

Cimmerian remains from the period of their presence in Anatolia include a burial from the village of İmirler in the Amasya Province of Turkey which contains typically Early Scythian weapons and horse harnesses. Another Cimmerian burial, located at about 100 km to the east of İmirler and 50 km from Samsun, contained 250 Scythian-type arrowheads.

Language

According to the historian Muhammad Dandamayev and the linguist János Harmatta, the Cimmerians spoke a dialect belonging to the Scythian group of Iranian languages, and were able to communicate with Scythians proper without needing interpreters. The Iranologist Ľubomír Novák considers Cimmerian to be a relative of Scythian which exhibited similar features as Scythian, such as the evolution of the sound /d/ into /l/.

The recorded personal names of the Cimmerians were either Iranian, reflecting their origins, or Anatolian, reflecting the cultural influence of the native populations of Asia Minor on them after their migration there.

Only a few personal names in the Cimmerian language have survived in Assyrian inscriptions:
:
According to the linguist János Harmatta, it goes back to Old Iranian , meaning "swelling with strength", although Askold Ivantchik has criticised this proposal on phonetic grounds.
Askold Ivantchik instead posits three alternative suggestions for an Old Iranian origin of :
 "abductor of horses"
 "abductor dog"
 "divine dog"

According to János Harmatta, it goes back to Old Iranian  "giving happiness."
Edwin M. Yamauchi also interprets the name as Iranian, citing Ossetic , meaning "ruling with strength," although this proposal has been criticised because  represents the modern phonetics of Ossetian and its form during the Old Iranian period when the Cimmerians lived would have been .
Askold Ivantchik instead suggests that the name / was a loanword from an Anatolian language, more specifically Luwian, while also accepting the alternative possibility of a derivation from a variant of the name of the Hurrian deity /.

According to János Harmatta, it goes back to Old Iranian  "splendid son."
Askold Ivantchik derives the name  from a compound term consisting of the name of the Anatolian deity , and of the Iranian term .

Genetics
A genetic study published in Science Advances in October 2018 examined the remains of three Cimmerians buried between around 1000 and 800 BC. The two samples of Y-DNA extracted belonged to haplogroups R1b1a and Q1a1, while the three samples of mtDNA extracted belonged to haplogroups H9a, C5c and R. 

Another genetic study published in Current Biology in July 2019 examined the remains of three Cimmerians. The two samples of Y-DNA extracted belonged to haplogroups R1a-Z645 and R1a2c-B111, while the three samples of mtDNA extracted belonged to haplogroups H35, U5a1b1 and U2e2.

Cimmerian kings

Kings of the western (Anatolian) Cimmerians
 Teušpa (?-679 BC)
 Tugdamme (679-640 BC)
 Sandakšatru (640-)

See also 
 Agathyrsi
 Scythians
 Scytho-Siberian world
 Umman Manda
 Medes
 Cimbri

References

Citations

Sources 

 
 
 
 
 
 
 
 
 
 
 
 
 
 
 

 
 
 
 
 
 
 
 
 
 
 
 
 
 
 
 
 
 
 
Terenozhkin A.I., Cimmerians, Kiev, 1983
 
 
 
 
Collection of Slavonic and Foreign Language Manuscripts – St.St Cyril and Methodius – Bulgarian National Library: http://www.nationallibrary.bg/slavezryk_en.html 

Cimmerians
Peoples of the Caucasus
History of the North Caucasus
Historical Iranian peoples
Iranian nomads
Ancient history of Ukraine
Ancient Russia
Tribes described primarily by Herodotus
Eastern Iranian languages
Extinct languages of Asia